Acorn Corner is an unincorporated community in Pemiscot County, in the U.S. state of Missouri.

History
The community once contained Acorn Corner School, now defunct.  The schoolhouse was named for a grove of acorn-bearing oak trees near the original town site.

References

Unincorporated communities in Pemiscot County, Missouri
Unincorporated communities in Missouri